The OECC, established in 1996, is an annual conference which publishes proceedings and scientific research articles as a result of its conferences. OECC stands for the OptoElectronics and Communications Conference, which has conducted annual meetings since its establishment up to the present year. With an international scope, the areas of focus for the OECC are annual meetings in the Asia Pacific region, centered on the optoelectronics and
optical communications profession. The function of the meetings are to report, discuss, exchange, and generate ideas which advance the disciplines of optoelectronics and optical communications. Communicating current and future applications related to these disciplines are also a function of these meetings.

Scope
Topical coverage for this annual conference includes optical fiber and communication networks (architecture, performance, routing, WDM systems, WDM networks, solitons, OTDM, CDMA, and fiber nonlinearities),  computer networks (protocols, security, design, algorithms, management, and  modules) applications in photonics, commercial technologies (including wireless, multimedia, virtual reality, communications, speech, and software), optoelectronic devices, semiconductor lasers, and other related topics.

Past OECCs

References

External links
OECC Homepage
1999 Proceedings online. IEEE Explore. 18–22 October 1999.
1999 Proceedings WorldCat. September 2010. OCLC Number: 43439039  or 9787563504022.
2009 Proceedings online. IEEE Explore. 13–17 July 2009.
Bibliographic information. 1999 proceedings. Library of Congress. 2010.

Optoelectronics
International conferences